David Albert Kelly   (March 25, 1932 in Nassau, Bahamas –  March 11, 2009 in New York City, New York) was a Bahamian Olympic sailor in the Dragon class. He competed in the 1968 Olympics together with Godfrey Kelly and Roy Ramsay, and finished 16th, and in the 1972 Olympics together with Christopher McKinney and Godfrey Kelly, finishing 19th. Kelly also competed in the Star class, finishing 5th together with Basil Kelly in the 1955 Star World Championships.

References

Sportspeople from Nassau, Bahamas
Olympic sailors of the Bahamas
Bahamian male sailors (sport)
Dragon class sailors
Star class sailors
Sailors at the 1968 Summer Olympics – Dragon
Sailors at the 1972 Summer Olympics – Dragon
1932 births
2009 deaths